The African Union of Broadcasting (AUB) is a professional body composed of the national radio and television organizations of African states. The organization is committed to the development of all aspects of broadcasting in Africa including the exchange of indigenous programming. It is headquartered in Dakar, Senegal.

History
AUB was founded in 1962 as the Union of African National Television and Radio Organizations (URTNA), an autonomous specialized agency working under the auspices of the OAU. The organization was renamed to African Union of Broadcasting at the 2006 URTNA General Assembly held in Abuja, Nigeria.

Members

These are members who are independent nations within the AUB broadcasting region, and consist of at least one member per country.

Participant members

The following nine AUB broadcast members have status as Participants as of May 2022.

Associate members
Below is a list of associate members of the AUB. These are international broadcasters beyond the AUB regions, and national broadcasting associations.

References

External links
 

Broadcasting associations
Organizations established in 1962